The Northern League was a regional Scottish football competition held between 1891 and 1920.

In 1908–09, six clubs left to form the Central Football League and the league shut down for the First World War, returning for a final season in 1919–20.

Dundee 'A' won the title five times, also sharing it on a sixth occasion.

Details

History

Number of titles

Note: Two titles were also shared: the 1891–92 title between Dundee East End and Dundee Our Boys, and the 1906–07 title between Kirkcaldy United and Dundee 'A'. As neither title was won outright, they are not included in the above record.

References

Defunct football leagues in Scotland